Someone to Love is a 1987 comedy film directed by Henry Jaglom. It was Orson Welles' final live action film appearance, released after his death but produced before his voice-over in The Transformers: The Movie, his final film performance.

The film was screened in the Un Certain Regard section at the 1987 Cannes Film Festival.

Plot
The film is a pseudo-documentary about a filmmaker who throws a Valentine's Day party at an old theater that is about to be demolished. The filmmaker invites numerous single friends, including his brother, the real estate agent who sold the theater to a developer who is going to build a modern shopping mall, to the party and then quizzes them on camera about their lives, failed relationships, intimacy issues, and loneliness.

Cast
 Orson Welles as himself
 Henry Jaglom as Danny Sapir
 Andrea Marcovicci as Helene Eugene
 Michael Emil as Mickey Sapir
 Sally Kellerman as Edith Helm
 Oja Kodar as Yolena
 Stephen Bishop as Blue
 David Frishberg as Harry
 Miles Kreuger as Theatre Manager
 Bjorke Andersun as Truck Driver

See also
 Your Name Here – a 2015 Canadian docufiction film directed by B. P. Paquette featuring dozens of amateur actors and that examines the art and craft of movie acting, and the desire for movie stardom.
 Hello Cinema – a 1995 Iranian docufiction film directed by Mohsen Makhmalbaf that shows various everyday people being auditioned and explaining their reason for wanting to act in a film.
 Filming Othello – a 1978 documentary film directed by and starring Orson Welles about the making of his award-winning 1952 production Othello. 
 F for Fake – the last major film completed by Orson Welles, who directed, co-wrote, and starred in the film, which is loosely a documentary that operates in several different genres and has been described as a kind of film essay.

References

External links
 
 

1987 films
1987 comedy films
Films directed by Henry Jaglom
American comedy films
1980s English-language films
1980s American films